The Peru national rugby league team, nicknamed Incas (English: Peru Incas), represents Peru in rugby league.

History
The sport has yet to be played on Peruvian soil but efforts are in place to bring rugby league to Central and South America through the Latin Heat Rugby League. The Latin Heat fielded enough Peruvian players to make up a Rugby league sevens team so they have entered into the first ever Latino Rugby League Sevens tournament.

The Incas made their debut at the first ever Latino Sevens on 17 October 2015, recording their first ever victories and making it to the final.  The Incas also participated in a festival of Latin American Rugby League which was held at Henson Park in June, 2016. Each nation fielded either a Nine-a-side or a Seven-a-side team, the other participating nations included Ecuador, Colombia and Uruguay. The Incas made their International 13-a-side rugby league debut against Uruguay at Waminda Oval in Campbelltown, NSW. The Incas won this match 34-30, giving them a win on debut.

Current squad

This is the current squad as of the 15th of September 2019.

Record 

Below is table of the representative rugby league matches played by Peru at test level up until the 22nd of February, 2020. The table includes 7-a-side, 9-a-side and 13-a-side International matches.

13-a-side fixtures and results:

References

National rugby league teams
Rugby league in Peru
National sports teams of Peru
South American national rugby league teams